Mighty Man refers to any one of several fictional, super-powered individuals in literature:

 Mighty Man (Image Comics), a super-powered, recurring superhero in Erik Larsen's Savage Dragon comic series
 Mighty Man (television), a diminutive, crime-fighter character on Mighty Man and Yukk (1980 to 1981)
 Mighty Man (Centaur Comics), a Centaur Publications comics character 
 Mighty Man (comics), a re-imagined version of the Centaur Comics Hero, published by Malibu Comics